Baegunsan  is a mountain of Jeollabuk-do, western South Korea. It has an elevation of 1,279 metres.

See also
List of mountains of Korea

References

Mountains of South Gyeongsang Province
Mountains of North Jeolla Province
Hamyang County
Jangsu County
Mountains of South Korea
One-thousanders of South Korea